Otávio de Faria (October 15, 1908 – October 17, 1980) was a Brazilian journalist and writer. He was elected a member of the Brazilian Academy of Letters on January 13, 1972. He was most noted as author of the monumental testimonial (and prophetic) A Tragédia burguesa (The Bourgeois Tragedy).

In a noted essay, "Pandeísmo em Carlos Nejar", de Faria "spoke of the pandeism of Carlos Nejar"; in the evaluation of Giovanni Pontiero, 

He was born in Rio de Janeiro, son of Alberto Faria and Maria Teresa de Almeida Faria, and in Rio de Janeiro he died.

References

External links 
 Biografia no sítio oficial da Academia Brasileira de Letras

1908 births
1980 deaths
Members of the Brazilian Academy of Letters
Writers from Rio de Janeiro (city)
Brazilian journalists
Brazilian male writers
20th-century journalists